208 (Liverpool) Field Hospital is a unit of the Royal Army Medical Corps within the Army Reserve of the British Army.

History
The hospital was formed upon the formation of the TAVR in 1967, from the amalgamation of 8th (Liverpool) General Hospital, 165th (Western) Casualty Clearing Station, and 126th (Bebington) Field Ambulance, as the 208 (Liverpool) General Hospital. Throughout the Cold War, the hospital was under the command of 42nd (Northwest) Infantry Brigade; and on transfer to war, would re-subordinate to Commander Medical BAOR, to provide 800 beds in the 4th Garrison Area. During the reforms implemented after the Cold War, the hospital was re-designated as 208 (Liverpool) Field Hospital. As a consequence of Army 2020, the unit now falls under 2nd Medical Brigade, and is paired with 22 Field Hospital.

Current Structure
The hospital's current structure is as follows:
Headquarters, at Chavasse House, Liverpool
A Squadron, at Chavasse House, Liverpool
B Squadron, at Ellesmere Port
C Squadron, at Sir Matthew Fell House, Blackpool
D Squadron, at Alexandra Barracks, Lancaster

References

Military units and formations established in 1967
Units of the Royal Army Medical Corps
Liverpool